Jobriath is the first album by the American glam rock artist Jobriath and was released in 1973. The album cover was photographed by Shig Ikeda.

Track listing
All tracks composed by Jobriath
 "Take Me I'm Yours" (4:14)
 "Be Still" (3:40)
 "World Without End" (3:43)
 "Space Clown" (2:37)
 "Earthling" (3:53)
 "Movie Queen" (1:50)
 "I'maman" (3:35)
 "Inside" (3:52)
 "Morning Starship" (3:30)
 "Rock of Ages" (2:21)
 "Blow Away" (4:59)

Personnel
Jobriath
Billy Schwartz
Steve Love
John Syomis
Andy Munson
Ken Bichel
Peter Frampton
Carl Hall
Tasha Thomas
Rhetta Hughes
Heather Macrae
Zenobia
Peggy Nestor
Gerhard

References

1973 debut albums
Jobriath albums
Albums produced by Eddie Kramer
Elektra Records albums